</noinclude>

Love in a Cold Climate is a 1980 British television series produced by Thames Television. It is an adaptation of the Nancy Mitford novels The Pursuit of Love (1945) and Love in a Cold Climate (1949), set between 1924 and 1940, with a screenplay adaptation by Simon Raven. It was originally broadcast on the ITV network in eight episodes. The series starred Lucy Gutteridge, Rosalyn Landor, Michael Aldridge, Judi Dench, Vivian Pickles, and Jean-Pierre Cassel.

Production
The filming of the serial has been described as "most uncharacteristically relaxed" for the actors, as it had been scheduled during what proved to be a long-running dispute between ITV and the Association of Cinematograph, Television and Allied Technicians union. At first, there was a work-to-rule, and the actors were not called until 11 am, with filming ending at about 4 pm. The dispute then escalated into a full strike, and filming was abandoned, with the actors being paid a retainer until it could be resumed.

Cast

Judi Dench as Aunt Sadie (Lady Alconleigh)
Michael Aldridge as Uncle Matt (Matthew Radlett, Lord Alconleigh)
Michael Williams as Davey Warbeck
Lucy Gutteridge as Linda 
John Moffatt as Lord Merlin
Isabelle Amyes as Fanny 
Vivian Pickles as Lady Montdore
Job Stewart as Boy Dougdale
Rosalyn Landor as Lady Polly Hampton 
Rebecca Saire as Victoria
Christopher Scoular as Alfred
Richard Hurndall as Lord Montdore
Michael Cochrane as Cedric Hampton
Yolande Palfrey as Jassy 
Selena Carey-Jones as Louisa
Max Harris as Little Matt
Jean-Pierre Cassel as Fabrice, duc de Sauveterre
Patience Collier as duchesse de Sauveterre
Anthony Head as Tony Kroesig
Peter Howell as Duke of Paddington
Joshua Le Touzel as Bob
David Parfitt as Little Matt
Leon Eagles as Sir Leicester Kroesig 
Daphne Neville as Lady Kroesig
Diana Fairfax as Emily Warbeck
Adrienne Corri as Veronica Chaddesley-Corbett
Noel Johnson as Lord Stromboli
Ralph Lawson as Christian Talbot 
Ann Queensberry as Lady Patricia
Richard Beale as Josh 
Michael Lees as Lord Fort-William
Amanda Boxer as Young Baroness
Sheila Brennan as The Bolter
Anthony Higgins as Juan 
Suzanne Burden as Lavender Davis
Michael Elwyn as Roly
Tamzin Neville as Linda
Kate Valentine as Fanny
Katherine Kath as Old Countess
Simon Lack as Doctor
Emma Higginson as Victoria
Geoffrey Lumsden as Sir Archibald Curtly
Pamela Pitchford as Mrs Hunt
Michael Jayes as Robert Parker
Gillian Maude as Germaine
Gérard Falconetti as Barman

Notes

External links

The Nancy Mitford web site

1980 British television series debuts
1980 British television series endings
1980s British drama television series
1980s British television miniseries
Television shows based on British novels
ITV television dramas
Period television series
Television series by Fremantle (company)
Television shows produced by Thames Television
English-language television shows
Television shows set in England